The Stolen Airship is a 1966 live-action/animated film by Czech filmmaker Karel Zeman. The story is based loosely on Jules Verne's novels Two Years' Vacation and The Mysterious Island. The film in Art Nouveau style consists of live-action scenes, generally shot in black and white, as well as hand-drawn, stop motion, and cutout animation. Various live-action and animated elements are often composited into the same scene.

Cast 

 Hanus Bor as Tomás Dufek
 Jan Cizek as Martin
 Jan Malát as Pavel
 Michal Pospísil as Jakoubek Kurka
 Josef Stráník as Petr
 Jitka Zelenohorská as Katka
 Jana Sedlmajerová as Renata (Sekretárka)
 Vera Macku as Martinova (Matka)
 Eva Kubesová as Dufková
 Marie Brozová as Jakoubkova babicka

References

External links 
 
 Study guide for the film 

1967 films
1967 animated films
1967 adventure films
Czech aviation films
Italian animated films
Films directed by Karel Zeman
Films with live action and animation
Films using stop-motion animation
Animated films based on novels
Films based on French novels
Films based on works by Jules Verne
Art Nouveau works
Films based on multiple works
Czechoslovak animated films
Czech animated films
Czech adventure films
Films with screenplays by Karel Zeman
Czechoslovak adventure films
Italian adventure films
1960s Italian films
Steampunk films
Czech animated adventure films
Czech animated fantasy films